Coccotylus is a genus of red algae belonging to the family Phyllophoraceae.

The species of this genus are found in Europe and Northern America.

Species:

Coccotylus hartzii 
Coccotylus truncatus

References

Phyllophoraceae
Red algae genera